Guy Rolfe (born Edwin Arthur Rolfe, 27 December 1911 – 19 October 2003) was a British actor.

Career
Rolfe was born in Kilburn, London. Before turning to acting at the age of 24 he was a professional boxer and racing driver, making his stage debut in Ireland in 1935. Repertory theatre led to his screen debut in 1937 with an uncredited appearance in Knight Without Armour.

After the Second World War he re-appeared in a number of bit parts throughout 1947 in films like Hungry Hill and Odd Man Out, which in turn led to larger roles in movies such as Uncle Silas (1947), Easy Money (1948) and in particular Ken Annakin's Broken Journey (1948), where he played the pilot of an aeroplane that crashes in the Alps. He then graduated to leading man status in Terence Fisher's Portrait from Life (1948), as a British army officer who helps an Austrian professor track down his missing daughter. 1949 saw perhaps his best role, that of safe cracker turned spy Philippe Lodocq in Robert Hamer's The Spider and the Fly.

He was cast as a British Army major dying of tuberculosis for the film Trio (1950), but actually contracted the disease and had to be replaced by Michael Rennie. He recovered his health in less than a year, but his time away from the screen hurt his career, and he starred in less prestigious B movies such as Home to Danger (1951) and Operation Diplomat (1953), as well as the Hammer films Yesterday's Enemy and The Stranglers of Bombay (both 1959). This period also saw him play a number of Hollywood roles, such as Prince John in Ivanhoe (1952), Ned Seymour in Young Bess (1953), Caiaphas in King of Kings (1961) and Prince Grigory in Taras Bulba (1962).

One of his most famous parts was the title role in William Castle's cult horror film Mr. Sardonicus (1961), which several decades later led director Stuart Gordon to cast him in his horror film Dolls (1987). The 1990s saw him continue in a similar vein when he appeared in five films of the Puppet Master series as Andre Toulon.

His television credits include Thriller, Armchair Theatre, The Saint, The Avengers, The Champions, Department S, The Troubleshooters, Space: 1999, Secret Army, The Widow of Bath and Kessler.

Personal life
He was married to the Scottish actress Jane Aird until her death in 1993, and then to Margret Allworthy until his death in 2003 in Ipswich, Suffolk. He is buried in the churchyard of St Mary's in Benhall, Suffolk.

Complete filmography

Knight Without Armour (1937) – Minor Role (uncredited)
The Drum (1938) – Undetermined Role (uncredited)
Hungry Hill (1947) – Miner
Odd Man Out (1947) – Policeman Watching Kathleen's House (uncredited)
Meet Me at Dawn (1947) – Ambassador's Friend (uncredited)
The Life and Adventures of Nicholas Nickelby (1947) – Mr. Folair (uncredited)
Uncle Silas (1947) – Sepulchre Hawkes
Easy Money (1948) – Archie
Broken Journey (1948) – Fox
The Guardsman (1948, TV Movie)
Saraband for Dead Lovers (1948) – Envoy at Ahlden
Which Will Ye Have? (1949, Short) – Captain of the guard
Portrait from Life (1948) – Major Lawrence
Fools Rush In (1949) – Paul Dickson
The Spider and the Fly (1949) – Philippe Lodocq
The Reluctant Widow (1950) – Lord Carlyon
Prelude to Fame (1950) – John Morell
Home to Danger (1951) – Robert Irving
Ivanhoe (1952) – Prince John
Without the Prince (1952, TV Movie)
Young Bess (1953) – Ned Seymour
The Veils of Bagdad (1953) – Kasseim
Operation Diplomat (1953) – Mr. Fenton
King of the Khyber Rifles (1953) – Karram Khan
Dance, Little Lady (1954) – Dr. John Ransome
It's Never Too Late (1956) – Stephen Hodgson
You Can't Escape (1956) – David Anstruther
Light Fingers (1957) – Dennis Payne
Girls at Sea (1958) – Capt. Alwin Maitland
Murder in Mind (1958, TV Movie)
Yesterday's Enemy (1959) – Padre
The Stranglers of Bombay (1959) – Captain Harry Lewis
The Barbarians (1960) – Kainus
Snow White and the Three Stooges (1961) – Count Oga
Mr. Sardonicus (1961) – Baron Sardonicus / Marek Toleslawski
King of Kings (1961) – Caiaphas
Taras Bulba (1962) – Prince Grigory
The Fall of the Roman Empire (1964) – Marius (uncredited)
The Alphabet Murders (1965) – Duncan Doncaster
Land Raiders (1970) – Major Tanner
Nicholas and Alexandra (1971) – Dr. Fedorov
And Now the Screaming Starts! (1973) – Maitland
Bloodline (1979) – Tod Michaels
The Case of Marcel Duchamp (1984) – Sherlock Holmes
The Bride (1985) – Count
Dolls (1987) – Gabriel Hartwicke
Visiting Mr. Beak (1987, Short) – Mr. Beak
Puppet Master III: Toulon's Revenge (1991) – André Toulon
Puppet Master 4 (1993) – André Toulon
Puppet Master 5: The Final Chapter (1994) – André Toulon
Retro Puppet Master (1999) – André Toulon

References

External links
 
 

1911 births
2003 deaths
English male film actors
English male television actors
People from Kilburn, London
20th-century English male actors